Coelosphaerium is a genus of cyanobacteria belonging to the family Merismopediaceae.

The species of this genus are found in Europe, America and Australia.

Species:

Coelosphaerium aerugineum 
Coelosphaerium confertum 
Coelosphaerium dubium 
Coelosphaerium evidenter-marginatum 
Coelosphaerium goetzei 
Coelosphaerium kuetzingianum 
Coelosphaerium limnicolum 
Coelosphaerium minutissimum 
Coelosphaerium subarcticum

References

Synechococcales
Cyanobacteria genera